The Kozhikode Corporation, is the municipal corporation that administers the city of Kozhikode (Calicut), Kerala. Established in 1962, it is in the Kozhikode parliamentary constituency. The first mayor was H. Manjunatha Rao. Its four assembly constituencies are Kozhikode North (State Assembly constituency) , Kozhikode South (State Assembly constituency) , Beypore (State Assembly constituency) and Elathur (State Assembly constituency). The Corporation is headed by a Mayor and council, and manages 118.58 km2 of the city of Kozhikode, with a population of about 609,224 within that area. Kozhikode Municipal Corporation has been formed with functions to improve the infrastructure of town.

History  
The ancient port of Tyndis which was located on the northern side of Muziris, as mentioned in the Periplus of the Erythraean Sea, was somewhere around Kozhikode. Its exact location is a matter of dispute. The suggested locations are Ponnani, Tanur, Beypore-Chaliyam-Kadalundi-Vallikkunnu, and Koyilandy. Tyndis was a major center of trade, next only to Muziris, between the Cheras and the Roman Empire. Pliny the Elder (1st century CE) states that the port of Tyndis was located at the northwestern border of Keprobotos (Chera dynasty). The North Malabar region, which lies north of the port at Tyndis, was ruled by the kingdom of Ezhimala during Sangam period. According to the Periplus of the Erythraean Sea, a region known as Limyrike began at Naura and Tyndis. However the Ptolemy mentions only Tyndis as the Limyrikes starting point. The region probably ended at Kanyakumari; it thus roughly corresponds to the present-day Malabar Coast. The value of Rome's annual trade with the region was estimated at around 50,000,000 sesterces. Pliny the Elder mentioned that Limyrike was  prone by pirates. The Cosmas Indicopleustes mentioned that the Limyrike was a source of peppers.Das, Santosh Kumar (2006). The Economic History of Ancient India. Genesis Publishing Pvt Ltd. p. 301.

In the 14th century, Kozhikode conquered larger parts of central Kerala after the seize of Tirunavaya region from Valluvanad, which were under the control of the king of Perumbadappu Swaroopam (Cochin). The ruler of Perumpadappu was forced to shift his capital (c. CE 1405) further south from Kodungallur to Kochi. In the 15th century, the status of Cochin was reduced to a vassal state of Kozhikode, thus leading to the emergence of Kozhikode as the most powerful kingdom on the medieval Malabar Coast.

Kozhikode was the largest city in the Indian state of Kerala under the rule of Zamorin of Calicut, an independent kingdom based at Kozhikode. It remained so until 18th century CE. Under British Raj, it acted as the headquarters of Malabar District, one of the two districts in the western coast of erstwhile Madras Presidency. The port at Kozhikode held the superior economic and political position in medieval Kerala coast, while Kannur, Kollam, and Kochi, were commercially important secondary ports, where the traders from various parts of the world would gather. The Portuguese arrived at Kappad Kozhikode in 1498 during the Age of Discovery, thus opening a direct sea route from Europe to South Asia. The port at Kozhikode was the gateway to South Indian coast for the Arabs, the Portuguese, the Dutch, and finally the British. The Kunjali Marakkars, who were the naval chief of the Zamorin of Kozhikode, are credited with organizing the first naval defense of the Indian coast. During the British rule, Malabar's chief importance lay in producing pepper. Kozhikode municipality was formed on 1 November 1866 according to the Madras Act 10 of 1865 (Amendment of the Improvements in Towns act 1850) of the British Indian Empire, making it the first modern municipality in the state. It was upgraded into a Municipal Corporation in 1962, making it the second-oldest Municipal Corporation in the state.

{
  "type": "ExternalData",
  "service": "geoline",
  "properties": {
    "stroke": "#0000ff",
    "stroke-width": 2
  },
  "query": "\nSELECT ?id ?idLabel (concat('', ?idLabel, '') as ?title) WHERE\n{\n?id wdt:P361 wd:Q28173697. # ward of Kozhikode corp\nSERVICE wikibase:label { bd:serviceParam wikibase:language 'en'.\n?id rdfs:label ?idLabel .\n}\n}"}

 Revenue sources 

The following are the Income sources for the Corporation from the Central and State Government.

 Revenue from taxes  
Following is the Tax related revenue for the corporation.

 Property tax.
 Profession tax.
 Entertainment tax.
 Grants from Central and State Government like Goods and Services Tax.
 Advertisement tax.

 Revenue from non-tax sources 

Following is the Non Tax related revenue for the corporation.

 Water usage charges.
 Fees from Documentation services.
 Rent received from municipal property.
 Funds from municipal bonds.

Divisions
Kozhikode Municipal Corporation is divided into 75 wards for ease of administration from which a member is elected from each for a duration of five years.

 Corporation Election 2020

 Political Performance in Election 2020 

2015 seat distribution: LDF - 50, UDF - 18,  BJP'- 7

References

External links
  

Municipal corporations in Kerala
Organisations based in Kozhikode
1962 establishments in Kerala